The 1905 Massillon Tigers football season  was their third season in existence. The team finished with a record of 9–0 and won their third Ohio League championship in as many years.

Schedule

Game notes

References

Massillon Tigers seasons
1905 in sports in Ohio
Massillon Tigers